Nizhegorodskaya is a station on the Nekrasovskaya line and the Bolshaya Koltsevaya line of the Moscow Metro. The station was opened on 27 March 2020.

Initially, the station operated as part of the Nekrasovskaya line with direct service from Nekrasovka to Aviamotornaya. Once the Bolshaya Koltsevaya line opened, Nekrasovskaya trains began to terminate here with a cross-platform interchange to that line.

Name
The station is named for the street on which it is situated. Nizhegorodskaya Street in turn is named for Nizhegorodsky Station, which was built in 1861 and closed in the 1950s.

Transfer
Out-of-station transfers available to Nizhegorodskaya on the Moscow Central Circle. The basic idea for the interchange node of the station was Moskovskaya station of the Nizhny Novgorod Metro.

References

Moscow Metro stations
Railway stations in Russia opened in 2020
Nekrasovskaya line
Bolshaya Koltsevaya line